Gary Haggarty (born ) is a former leader of an Ulster Volunteer Force unit in the Mount Vernon area of north Belfast and police "supergrass". In January 2018 he was sentenced to more than six years in jail after admitting to over 200 offences, including committing five murders.

In May 2018, Haggarty was released from prison and has been put into a witness protection programme.

References

External links
How many murders can a police informer get away with? The Guardian, 2018

1970s births
Irish people convicted of murder
Living people
People from Northern Ireland
Police informants
Ulster Volunteer Force members
Year of birth uncertain